Lagoseriopsis is a monotypic genus of flowering plants belonging to the family Asteraceae. The only species is Lagoseriopsis popovii.

Its native range is Central Asia.

References

Cichorieae
Monotypic Asteraceae genera